Golub-class guard ships were originally built as minelayers and netlayers for the Imperial Russian Navy. Two of the ships were captured by the Germans at Tallinn in 1918 and were given to Finland in 1920. Four more were completed in 1919 and sold via Germans to Chilean Navy (eventually named as Colocolo, Leucoton, Elicura, and Orompello).

The ships had fairly good seagoing abilities and were stable platforms. It was especially well suited for heavy minesweeping duties.

Golub class

References

Gunboat classes
Mine warfare vessel classes
Ships of the Chilean Navy
Gunboats of the Imperial Russian Navy